Motylyovo is a rural locality (a village) in Konoshsky District, Arkhangelsk Oblast, Russia. The population was 6 as of 2010.

Geography 
Motylyovo is located on the Liponga River, 41 km southeast of Konosha (the district's administrative centre) by road. Kharlamovskaya is the nearest rural locality.

References 

Rural localities in Konoshsky District